Şatırlı (also, Shatyrly) is a village and municipality in the Jalilabad Rayon of Azerbaijan.  It has a population of 1,244.

References 

Populated places in Jalilabad District (Azerbaijan)